Harry Stendhal  is an American gallerist, arts organization founder, and entrepreneur.

Galleries
As an art dealer he operated the Stendhal gallery in the Soho section of New York City and then the Maya Stendhal Gallery in Chelsea section of New York City (in partnership with his sister Maya) and exhibited among other artists; the painters Ron English and Rick Prol, the Dadaist Hans Richter and the Fluxus group members Ken Friedman and Larry Miller. In 2007 Hans Richter's artistic archives were displayed at the Gallery in an exhibition comprehensive of his Dada years and collaboration with Viking Eggeling, a fellow Dadaist who created the groundbreaking film Symphonie Diagonal and Hans Richter Rhythmus 21. The exhibition titled "Universal Language and the Avant-Garde" was covered in Artforum.

After exhibiting George Macunias' work at his now closed commercial gallery he opened the foundation in 2011.  The organization which when it had an artspace purpose' was to exhibit the entire inter-disciplinary body work of George Maciunas the Lithuanian born co-founder of the Fluxus art movement.  Stendhal's exhibitions of Maciunas' work were covered by among others Anthony Haden-Guest in the Financial Times and Fionn Meade in ArtForum.

In 1991 the Soho gallery hosted a benefit organized for the charity God's Love We Deliver which brings meals to homebound people with Aids and other serious illnesses organized by late fashion photographer Francesco Scavullo and featuring men's suits by such designers as Issac Mizrahi, Todd Oldham and Romeo Gigli which were then embellished (painted upon) by such artists as Ronnie Cutrone and  Ron English.
In 2004 Harry and his sister Maya commissioned the  painter and filmmaker Jeff Scher to create an animated film portrait of their friend Susan Shin and then offered the ability to commission a similar rendering to gallery clients.  This endeavor which was reported on by The New York Times.

Stendhal himself is a presence on the New York City social scene whose events draw press coverage as does his goings on about town.

During the second incarnation of his gallery Harry Stendhal became ensnared in legal imbroglios  with graphic designer and visual artist Paula Scher and the filmmaker and visual artist Jonas Mekas, a then-octagenarian, who accused the gallerist of selling his artwork without his consent and or reimbursement for among other things as an avenue for Stendhal to cover his tab at Cipriani. The Mekas case was eventually settled out of court, while Mekas was later accused of having been a Nazi collaborator during World War 2 in occupied Lithuania.

Fluxus llc. and the Fluxhouse
In 2013 he co-founded Fluxus llc, a privately held construction technology firm. In 2020 Fluxus with cooperation with Arcadis presented "Harnessing Prefabrication to Tackle the Affordable Housing Challenge: A Global Partnership Approach" at the Advancing Prefabrication conference in Dallas, Texas.  Their prototype the "Fluxhouse" is currently shown in Augmented reality on the website of the World Economic Forum for whom Fluxus llc. is helping to implement augmented reality technology.

References 

Year of birth missing (living people)
Living people
American art dealers